Sangarrén is a municipality located in the province of Huesca, Aragon, Spain. According to the  census (INE), the municipality has a population of  inhabitants.

References

Municipalities in the Province of Huesca